Thintervention with Jackie Warner is an American reality television series which premiered on September 6, 2010, on Bravo. The first season averaged 810,000 viewers. The show did not return for a second season.

Premise
The series encompasses Jackie Warner as she assists struggling clients to lose weight and live a healthy lifestyle. Instead of operating a typical boot-camp type program, Warner works with the clients in their environments where the clients are exposed to everyday stresses and triggers to eat unhealthy. Each week, all the members gather for group therapy and weekly weigh-in.

Cast

Episodes

References

External links

 
 
 

2010s American reality television series
2010 American television series debuts
2010 American television series endings
Bravo (American TV network) original programming
English-language television shows